John Clacher was a Scottish professional association footballer who played as a full back.

External links

Year of birth missing
Year of death missing
Footballers from Kirkcaldy
Scottish footballers
Association football defenders
Burnley F.C. players
Darlington F.C. players
English Football League players